Jerrybuccinum malvinense is a species of sea snail, a marine gastropod mollusk, in the family Buccinoidea (unassigned), the true whelks.

Description

Distribution

References

External links

Buccinoidea (unassigned)
Gastropods described in 2009